Xukuru (Xucuru, Shukurú, Ichikile) was a poorly attested language of Brazil. It is also known as Kirirí, Kirirí-Xokó, Ichikile. It is known only from a few word lists and a sketch by Geraldo Lapenda (1962).

It was originally spoken in the Serra de São José and on the Meio River, Capibaribe River and Taperoa River in the states of Pernambuco and Paraíba. Loukotka (1968) reports the most recent locations as the Serra Ararobá and Cimbres.

Classification
Loukotka (1968) considers Xukuru to form a small family with Paratió.

Other languages with this name
Xukuru-Kariri is a variety of Xokó, which may be a Kariri language. The name Kiriri is shared by Dzubukuá, another Kariri language, and by Katembri. The name Kiriri-Xoko is shared with yet another variety of Xokó.

Distribution
Geraldo Lapenda (1962) reported that the Xukuru people can be found primarily in the settlements of Canabrava and Brejinho in the aldeia of Cimbres, Pesqueira municipality. They can also be found in the settlements of Cajueiro, Ipanema Velho, Caldeirão, Jitó, Lagoa, Machado, Sitio do Meio, Riacho dos Afetos, Trincheiras, Bem-te-vi, Santana, and São José. Although the Xukuru traditionally occupied the Serra do Ororobá, they could also be found in other municipalities of Pernambuco, namely Caruaru, Brejo da Madre de Deus, Belo Jardim, Sanharó, Poção, Pesqueira, and Arcoverde.

Phonology

Consonants
Xukuru consonants:

Vowels
Xukuru vowels:

Xukuru also has nasalized vowels. Lapenda (1962) transcribes nasalized vowels as Vn (orthographic vowel followed by n).

Morphology
Common suffixes in Xukuru include -go, which forms verbs, adjectives, and nouns, and -men, of uncertain meaning.

Vocabulary

Pompeu (1958)
Xucurú vocabulary from Pompeu (1958), cited from Kurt Nimuendajú:

{| class="wikitable sortable"
! Portuguese gloss (original) !! English gloss (translated) !! Xucurú
|-
| homem || man || xenúpre
|-
| mulher || woman || moéla
|-
| fogo || fire || intôa
|-
| água || water || teu
|-
| pedra || stone || kébra
|-
| cabeça || head || kreká
|-
| orelha || ear || bandulak
|-
| bôca || mouth || mãz
|-
| nariz || nose || korõzá
|-
| língua || tongue || izarágo
|-
| dente || tooth || ciladê
|-
| mão || hand || kereké
|-
| pé || foot || poyá
|-
| casa || house || sek
|-
| olho (olha) || eye (see) || pigó
|}

Meader (1978)
Xukuru is also known from a word list elicited in 1961 by Paul Wagner from Antônio Caetano do Nascimento, the chief of Brazinho village in the Serra Urubu of Pesqueira, Pernambuco State. The list is reproduced below, with English translations also given.

Lapenda (1962)
The following Xucuru words are from Geraldo Lapenda (1962). The data was collected by Raimundo Dantas Carneiro and Cícero Cavalcanti. (Xukuru also has nasalized vowels. Lapenda (1962) transcribes nasalized vowels as Vn (orthographic vowel followed by n).)

Loukotka (1949)
The following Shukurú words are from Loukotka (1949). The data is from a 137-word manuscript list collected by Curt Nimuendajú in 1934 from 4 elderly semi-speakers in Pernambuco. The list was obtained by Loukotka in 1940.

{| class="wikitable sortable"
! French gloss (original) !! English gloss (translated) !! Shukurú
|-
| chien || dog || ʒebrégo
|-
| dent || tooth || tʃilodé
|-
| eau || water || téu
|-
| femme || woman || moéla
|-
| feu || fire || intóa
|-
| hache || axe || tilóa
|-
| homme || man || ʃenũprĕ
|-
| jaguar || jaguar || lamprémp
|-
| langue || tongue || ĩʃ-arágŏ
|-
| main || hand || koreké
|-
| maïs || maize || ʃígŭ
|-
| maison || house || ʃek
|-
| manioc || cassava || ʃakurarágŭ
|-
| manger || eat || kreŋgô
|-
| oreille || har || bandalák
|-
| pied || foot || poyá
|-
| pierre || stone || kéiba
|-
| pot || pot || koréka
|-
| serpent || snake || saŋsála
|-
| tabac || tobacco || mãʒé
|-
| tête || head || kreká
|}

Sentences
The following Xucuru sentences are from Lapenda (1962).

References

Lapenda, Geraldo Calábria. 1962. O dialecto Xucuru. Doxa (Revista Oficial do Departamento de Cultura do Diretório Acadêmico da Faculdade de Filosofia de Pernambuco da Universidade do Recife), ano X, n. 10, p. 11-23. Biblioteca Digital Curt Nimuendaju.

External links
Xukuru vocabulary

Language isolates of South America
Extinct languages of South America
Xukuruan languages
Indigenous languages of Northeastern Brazil